The 2017 IBSF Junior Skeleton World Championships took place at the Sigulda bobsleigh, luge, and skeleton track in Sigulda, Latvia, from 24 to 28 January 2017.

Schedule
Two events were held.

All times are local (UTC+2).

Medal table

Skeleton

References

2017 IBSF Junior Skeleton World Championships
2017 IBSF Junior Skeleton World Championships
January 2017 sports events in Europe